Phoenix Rising is a 1998 studio album by American vocal group The Temptations. It was released on the Motown label on August 18, 1998. Featuring the debut of new Temptations members Barrington "Bo" Henderson, Terry Weeks, and Harry McGilberry, following the departure of Ali-Ollie Woodson, who ended his tenure with the group (following the release of the 1995 album For Lovers Only); as well as the final Temptations album for Theo Peoples, who Henderson replaced. 

The album, the Temptations' first million-selling album in over twenty years, features the hit single "Stay" Although not commercially released as a single, "Stay" became a top 30 hit on the US Hot R&B/Hip-Hop Songs chart, peaking at number 28. It also peaked at number one on the Urban Adult Contemporary charts. Later singles "This Is My Promise" and "How Could He Hurt You" became top five hits respectively on the later chart as well. Phoenix Rising was certified Platinum by the Recording Industry Association of America (RIAA) on November 15, 1999.

Critical reception

AllMusic editor Andrew Hamilton wrote that "Temptations' albums used to feature a baritone voice distinct from the tenor not only in register, but in style and phrasing; here the voices are too similar. Still, not a bad silver platter when you take the personnel changes into consideration."

Commercial performance
Phoenix Rising became the band's first studio album to receive a platinum certification from the Recording Industry Association of America (RIAA).

Track listing

Notes
 denotes additional producer(s)

Personnel
The Temptations
Terry Weeks - tenor vocals
Barrington "Bo" Henderson - tenor vocals on "How Could He Hurt You"
Theo Peoples - tenor vocals
Otis Williams - baritone vocals
Ron Tyson - tenor/falsetto vocals
Harry McGilberry - bass vocals

Charts

Weekly charts

Year-end charts

Certifications

References

1998 albums
The Temptations albums
Albums produced by Narada Michael Walden
Motown albums